Rear Admiral (Junior Grade) Karl Wiesner is a retired South African Navy officer, who served as Director Maritime Warfare.

He attended the United States Naval War College in Newport, Rhode Island where he earned a diploma in National Security and Strategy and was awarded the Vice Admiral Doyle prize for International Law and Peacekeeping.

He commanded  from 2002 to 2007.

He also commanded the Warrior class strike craft .

He is currently the chief commercial operations officer of South African Shipyards.

References

South African admirals
Living people
Naval War College alumni
Year of birth missing (living people)